

In theoretical physics, dimensional regularization is a method introduced by Giambiagi and Bollini as well as – independently and more comprehensively – by 't Hooft and Veltman for regularizing integrals in the evaluation of Feynman diagrams; in other words, assigning values to them that are meromorphic functions of a complex parameter d, the analytic continuation of the number of spacetime dimensions.

Dimensional regularization writes a Feynman integral as an integral depending on the spacetime dimension d and the squared distances (xi−xj)2 of the spacetime points xi,  ... appearing in it. In Euclidean space, the integral often converges for −Re(d) sufficiently large, and can be analytically continued from this region to a meromorphic function defined for all complex d. In general, there will be a pole at the physical value (usually 4) of d, which needs to be canceled by renormalization to obtain physical quantities.
 showed that dimensional regularization is mathematically well defined, at least in the case of massive Euclidean fields, by using the Bernstein–Sato polynomial to carry out the analytic continuation.

Although the method is most well understood when poles are subtracted and d is once again replaced by 4, it has also led to some successes when d is taken to approach another integer value where the theory appears to be strongly coupled as in the case of the Wilson–Fisher fixed point. A further leap is to take the interpolation through fractional dimensions seriously. This has led some authors to suggest that dimensional regularization can be used to study the physics of crystals that macroscopically appear to be fractals.

It has been argued that Zeta regularization and dimensional regularization are equivalent since they use the same principle of using analytic continuation in order for a series or integral to converge.

Example 
Suppose one wishes to dimensionally regularize a loop integral which is logarithmically divergent in four dimensions, like

For non-integer dimensions, we define the value of the integral in this way by analytic continuation.

References

Further reading

Quantum field theory
Summability methods